The following is a timeline of the history of the city of Prato in the Tuscany region of Italy.

Prior to 20th century

 10th C. - Cathedral of Saint Stephen was already in existence.
 11th C. - Borgo di Cornio and Santo Stefano pieve (settlements) merged to form "Borgo di Prato."
 12th C. -  built.
 1107 - Prato besieged by forces of Matilda of Canossa.
 1142 - Comunal consul active (approximate date).
 1180 - Prato "under the Imperial supremacy."
 1193 - Office of "imperial podesta" formed (approximate date).
 13th C.
 Palazzo Pretorio, Prato assembled.
 Palazzo degli Alberti originates.
 1211 - Cathedral of San Stefano rebuilding begins.
 1228 - Franciscan church established.
 1248 - Castello dell'Imperatore (castle) built.
 1271 - Sant'Agostino monastery built.
 1283 - San Domenico church founded.
 1292 - Ordinamenti sacrati (law) adopted.
 1295 - San Francesco church built.
 14th C. - Corporazione dell'Arte della Lana (wool guild) formed.
 1301 - Black Guelphs in power.
 1313 - Prato "acknowledged the authority of Robert, King of Naples."
 1322 -  construction begins.
 1347 - Black Death plague.
 1351 - Prato sold to Florentines by Joanna I of Naples.
 1383 - Palazzo Datini construction begins.
 1429 - Population: 3,517 (approximate).
 1499 - Santa Maria delle Carceri church built.
 1512 -  by Spanish forces.
 1653
 Roman Catholic diocese of Pistoia e Prato formed.
 Prato "obtained the rank of city".
 1666 - Collegio Cicognini founded.
 1766 -  (library) built.
 1830 - Teatro Metastasio (theatre) opens.
 1861 - Population: 32,710.(it)

20th century

 1906 - Population: 20,197.
 1908 - A.C. Prato (football club) formed.
 1932 - Florence-Montecatini highway opens.
 1934
 Bologna–Florence railway begins operating.
 Prato Centrale railway station built.
 1936 - Population: 64,362.(it)
 1941 - Stadio Lungobisenzio (stadium) opens.
 1943 - Bombing of Prato in World War II.
 1944 - 7 September: .
 1945 -  (transit entity) formed.
 1950 -  built.
 1951 - Population: 77,631.(it)
 1954 - Roman Catholic Diocese of Prato established.
 1961 - Population: 111,285.(it)
 1967 - Prato Cathedral Museum founded.
 1971 - Population: 143,232.(it)
 1975 - Prato Textile Museum founded.
 1977
 Prato textile museum opens.
  (theatre) founded.
 1978 - Biblioteca comunale Lazzerini (library) established.
 1988 - Centro per l'arte contemporanea Luigi Pecci opens.
 1992 - Prato becomes seat of the newly formed Province of Prato.
 1998 -  built.

21st century
 2001 - Monash University, Prato Centre opened.
 2009 - Roberto Cenni becomes mayor.
 2013 - Population: 187,159.
 2014 - Matteo Biffoni becomes mayor.
 2015 - 31 May: Tuscan regional election, 2015 held.

See also
 
 List of mayors of Prato
 List of bishops of Prato, 1653–present (in Italian)
 History of Tuscany

Other cities in the macroregion of Central Italy:(it)
 Timeline of Ancona, Marche region
 Timeline of Arezzo, Tuscany region
 Timeline of Florence, Tuscany 
 Timeline of Livorno, Tuscany
 Timeline of Lucca, Tuscany
 Timeline of Perugia, Umbria region
 Timeline of Pisa, Tuscany
 Timeline of Pistoia, Tuscany
 Timeline of Rome, Lazio region
 Timeline of Siena, Tuscany

References

This article incorporates information from the Italian Wikipedia.

Bibliography

in English

in Italian
 
  (bibliography)
 
 S. Nicastro. Sulla storia di Prato dalle origini alla metà del sec. XIX, Prato 1916
 
 . Origini della città e del Comune di Prato, 1984.
 
 Percorsi sulla memoria. Le trasformazioni del territorio pratese, Giunti Editore, 1998.
 . Breve storia di Prato, Pacini Editore, 2006.
 Giuseppe Testa. Prato, la storia e i suoi due distretti, Pentalinea, 2009.

External links

 Archivio di Stato di Prato (state archives)
 Items related to Prato, various dates (via Europeana)
 Items related to Prato, various dates (via Digital Public Library of America)

Prato
Prato
prato